CJFB-FM is a Canadian radio station that broadcasts a variety hits format which operates at 102.7 FM in Bolton, Ontario. The station is branded as 102.7 Moose FM.

History 
Rick Sargent, the owner of the station, was given approval by the Canadian Radio-television and Telecommunications Commission (CRTC) on October 15, 2007 to broadcast on the frequency 105.5 FM at Bolton. The new station will offer an eclectic adult contemporary music format that will feature pop, rock, country, folk, blues, jazz and classical music including local, Canadian, and emerging artists. CJFB-FM was also a community radio/tourist information station.

The station was branded as B105.5 or The B.

On April 9, 2008, the station submitted an application to convert CFGM-FM 102.7 Caledon to a transmitter of CJFB-FM. That application was denied on July 31, 2008.

On March 14, 2012, the CRTC approved the application by Haliburton Broadcasting Group Inc. for authority to acquire from Rick Sargent the assets of CJFB-FM and CFGM-FM, and for broadcasting licences to continue the operation of the stations.

On April 23, 2012 Vista Broadcast Group, which owns a number of radio stations in western Canada, announced a deal to acquire Haliburton Broadcasting, in cooperation with Westerkirk Capital. The transaction was approved by the CRTC on October 19, 2012.

On May 4, 2015, Vista received approval from the CRTC to change the frequency of CJFB-FM to 102.7 MHz. The CRTC also approved a change the station's authorized contours by increasing the average effective radiated power (ERP) from 50 to 1,565 watts (maximum ERP from 50 to 4,000 watts), changing the antenna's radiation pattern from non-directional to directional and decreasing its effective height above average terrain (EHAAT) from 15.7 to -22 metres. Vista has also submitted a separate application to revoke the licence for CFGM-FM 102.7 MHz.

Vista Radio received extensions from the CRTC to April 15, 2020 and was given a third, and final, extension to October 15, 2020 to relocate CFJB-FM 105.5 MHz in Bolton to 102.7 MHz and increase the power from 50 to 1,100 watts.

In August 2021, Vista announced that CJFB-FM will be relaunching the station at 102.7 MHz with a new format and branding in September 2021. On September 3, 2021 at 11:00 AM EDT, Vista launched the radio station as Moose FM with a classic hits and variety hits format which will feature a high energy mix from some of the greatest music performers from the 1960s to today. The first song played on 102.7 Moose FM was "Start Me Up" by The Rolling Stones.

References

External links
102.7 Moose FM
 

Jfb
Jfb
Caledon, Ontario
JFB
Radio stations established in 2007
2007 establishments in Ontario